Dubyshche is an urban-type settlement in Lutsk Raion of Volyn Oblast in Ukraine. It is located on the right bank of the Styr, a tributary of the Pripyat, in the drainage basin of the Dnieper. Population:

Economy

Transportation
There is intensive passenger traffic.

The settlement has access, via Rozhyshche, to Highway M19 connecting Chernivtsi via Ternopil and Lutsk with Kovel.

References

Urban-type settlements in Lutsk Raion